Angola competed at the 2008 Summer Olympics in Beijing, China. This is a list of all of the Angolan athletes who qualified for the Olympics.

Athletics

Men

Basketball

The men's team qualified by winning the FIBA Africa Championship 2007 tournament.
 Men's team event – 1 team of 12 players

Men's tournament
Roster

Group play

Canoeing

Sprint

Qualification Legend: QS = Qualify to semi-final; QF = Qualify directly to final

Handball

Angola hadqualified a women's team.
 Women's team event – 1 team of 14 players

Women's tournament
Roster

Group play

Swimming

Men

Women

Volleyball

Beach

See also
 Angola at the 2008 Summer Paralympics

References

Nations at the 2008 Summer Olympics
2008
Summer Olympics